Lake Lansing Park South is a public park in Haslett, Michigan covering . The entrance to the park is located at 1621 Pike Street. Lake Lansing Park South offers a beach, bathhouse, multi-purpose dock, snack bar (open in the summer,) a playground near the beach, and covered picnic tables.

Parking is available on the north side of the park, and there is a vehicle entrance fee.

Amusement Park
The park was once home to a popular amusement park, which was established in 1910. By the 1940s, the amusement park had become a popular destination for both locals and visitors to the area. A wooden rollercoaster was in operation at the park for over 60 years. In 1971 the carousel was sold to Cedar Point, and the roller coaster was shut down due to safety concerns. The amusement park closed its doors in 1974, and the land was acquired by Ingham County.

See also
List of lakes in Michigan
Lake Lansing Park North
Lake Lansing

References

External links
 Ingham County Parks
 Lake Lansing Property Owners Organization
 Lake Lansing Park South

Parks in Michigan
1974 establishments in Michigan